The palatoglossus or palatoglossal muscle is a muscle of the soft palate and extrinsic muscle of the tongue. Its surface is covered by oral mucosa and forms the visible palatoglossal arch.

Structure
Palatoglossus arises from the palatine aponeurosis of the soft palate, where it is continuous with the muscle of the opposite side, and passing downward, forward, and lateralward in front of the palatine tonsil, is inserted into the side of the tongue, some of its fibers spreading over the dorsum, and others passing deeply into the substance of the organ to intermingle with the transverse muscle of tongue.

Innervation
Palatoglossus is the only muscle of the tongue that is not innervated by the hypoglossal nerve (CN XII). It is innervated by the pharyngeal branch of the vagus nerve (CN X).

Controversy
Some sources state that the palatoglossus is innervated by fibers from the cranial part of the accessory nerve (CN XI) that travel via the pharyngeal plexus.

Other sources state that the palatoglossus is not innervated by XI hitchhiking on X, but rather it is innervated by IX via the pharyngeal plexus formed from IX and X.

Function
Elevates posterior tongue, closes the oropharyngeal isthmus, and aids initiation of swallowing. This muscle also prevents the spill of saliva from vestibule into the oropharynx by maintaining the palatoglossal arch.

References

External links
 

Muscles of the head and neck
Tongue
Innervation of the tongue.